Josh Osborne (born c. 1980) is an American songwriter with several number-one singles to his credit.

Early life
Josh Osborne was born in Pike County, Kentucky, and raised in Virgie, Kentucky. Osborne grew up on US 23, renamed Country Music Highway by the state of Kentucky in honor of the many country music artists who had come from the area, and developed a deep love of country music, particularly artists like Keith Whitley and Dwight Yoakam. Josh graduated from Shelby Valley High School in 1998 and moved right after graduation to Nashville where he signed his first publishing deal with Warner Chappell Music.

Career
Josh Osborne signed a publishing agreement with Black River Entertainment in 2010. In 2015, Osborne announced he was joining Shane McAnally's company, SMACKSongs as a partner and songwriter. SMACKSongs currently represents McAnally, as well as Josh Jenkins, Ryan Beaver, Aaron Eshuis, and Walker Hayes among other writers. Osborne is a multi-platinum, GRAMMY Award winning songwriter based in Nashville, Tenn. who has notched 23 No. 1s on the Country charts. He earned his first No. 1 with Kenny Chesney’s "Come Over," in 2012. Since the Platinum-selling hit, Osborne has received countless cuts by Country’s hottest artists including Sam Hunt, Miranda Lambert, Kacey Musgraves, Blake Shelton, Keith Urban and more.

Osborne has since written other Billboard Country Airplay chart-topping songs, including "Drunk Last Night," recorded by Eli Young Band, "My Eyes," performed by Blake Shelton featuring Gwen Sebastian, "We Are Tonight," sung by Billy Currington, "Leave the Night On" and  "Take Your Time" by Sam Hunt, "Wild Child", written with Chesney and frequent collaborator Shane McAnally featuring Grace Potter, "Sangria" performed by Blake Shelton, Jake Owen's "Real Life", "John Cougar, John Deere, John 3:16", performed by Keith Urban, Tim McGraw's "Top of the World", "Setting the World on Fire" performed by Kenny Chesney featuring Pink, the Grammy and Academy of Country Music Award nominated "Vice" performed by Miranda Lambert, Midland's "Drinking Problem" (which he also produced), and Kenny Chesney's  "All the Pretty Girls". Osborne has been nominated for over 20 awards by the Academy of Country Music, American Country Awards, ASCAP, Billboard Music Awards, Country Music Association, Music Row and NARAS. Kacey Musgraves’ "Merry Go 'Round," written by Osborne, Shane McAnally and Musgraves, earned Osborne four nominations and won Song Of The Year at the 2013 Music Row Awards and Best Country Song at the 2014 GRAMMY Awards. Also in 2014, Osborne was honored by having his name added to the prestigious Country Music Highway, which runs through the state of Kentucky and near his hometown of Virgie. RIAA Certified Double Platinum No. 1 hit, "Take Your Time," recorded by Sam Hunt and written by Osborne, McAnally and Hunt, earned Osborne a nomination for Song of the Year at the 2015 CMA Awards. 2015 also brought several wins at the ASCAP Awards — earning Osborne Song of the Year for Sam Hunt's "Leave the Night On" and Songwriter of the Year. In 2017, Miranda Lambert's "Vice," written by Osborne, McAnally and Lambert, was nominated for Best Country Song at the GRAMMY Awards and Song of the Year at the ACM Awards. Osborne has been nominated five times for Songwriter of the Year by the ACM and has received multiple CMA Triple Play Awards for having three No. 1 songs on the charts in a 12-month period. Osborne earned a 5× Platinum No.1 with “Body Like A Back Road,” written by Sam Hunt, Shane McAnally, Osborne, and Zach Crowell. The single made history as the longest reigning No. 1 on the Billboard Hot Country Song chart by a solo artist, spending 34 weeks atop the chart and was named ASCAP's 2018 Song of the Year. Most recently, he won Song of the Year at the 2020 ACM Awards for co-writing Old Dominion’s “One Man Band.”

Awards and nominations

Producer
Osborne has produced or co-produced the following works:

Songwriting discography
Songs written or co-written by Osborne.

References

External links
 Josh Osborne | Credits | AllMusic

1980s births
Living people
Country musicians from Kentucky
People from Pike County, Kentucky
American country singer-songwriters
Singer-songwriters from Kentucky
21st-century American singers